Lauser is a surname of German origin with several possible meanings. Notable people with the surname include:

David Lauser (born 1951), American rock drummer
Jessica Lauser (born 1980), American chess player
Steffen Lauser (born 1984), German former professional footballer